The Golden Spread Council is a local council of the Boy Scouts of America and serves youth in the panhandles of Texas and Oklahoma.  Its service area includes all or part of 23 counties in Texas and three counties in Oklahoma. Through 2010, the council served approximately 5,300 youth members and 1,700 adult leaders.

History
The council was formed in 1987 from the consolidation of the Llano Estacado Council (#562)  (based in Amarillo, TX) and the Adobe Walls Council (#569) (based in Pampa, TX).

Organization
 Golden Eagle District
 Lone Wolf District
 Quanah Parker District
 Adobe Walls District

Camps
The Golden Spread Council owns and operates two camp properties, Camp Don Harrington in Canyon, Texas; and Camp M.K. Brown by Wheeler, Texas.

These facilities offer a wide range of camping, hiking and outdoor opportunities, including: miles of hiking trails, ponds and lakes, open fields, rustic camp sites, sheltered camp sites, tent camping sites, and a dining hall with restroom facilities.

Camp Don Harrington
Camp Don Harrington, commonly referred to as Camp Don, is an  Boy Scout camp in Randall County near Canyon, Texas.  The original  were donated by oil man and investor Don Harrington on December 25, 1945.  In 1994, Sybil Harrington, Don Harrington's wife,  donated the money to refurbish the camp with repaving the roads,  refurbishing the health lodge, a new quartermaster building, and building the new Cub Scout World.

Geography
It has a semi-arid temperate steppe climate, with the average summer high temperature in the high 90s and average winter low temperature in the low 20s. The average yearly rainfall is 19.6 inches.

The majority of camp sites and facilities are located inside the canyon.  It is more rugged and forested than the surrounding prairie, creating a more desirable camping experience.  A variety of plant and wildlife exist in the camp.  The canyon floor is spotted with yucca, mesquite, cactus, and other prairie grasses and shrubs.  Closer to the river, one can find larger trees and even a bamboo stand.  Wildlife in the camp include coyotes, deer, prairie dogs, rattlesnakes (no bites reported in many years), and a wide array of insects.

Facilities and Programs
Camp Don Harrington has 18 permanent campsites available year-round, each with a cleared area, a fire ring, running water (except during winter months) and a latrine.  An earth-fill dam has been erected on the river forming a small pond suitable for fishing, boating and canoeing.  Permanent structures include a dining hall with kitchen, swimming pools, first aid station, administrative building, quartermasters shed, trading post, Campmaster's quarters (with 2 bedrooms, kitchen, full bath, and living room) and ranger's house.  The camp has an archery range, rifle range, shotgun range, and an council ring.  A COPE area includes a ropes course and a climbing wall with a zip line.  A newer addition is a four element "Cub World" with a pirate ship, fort, castle, and tee-pee.

The Camp is used for weekend camping by nearby units.  It also holds annual merit badge summer camps and winter camps and Cub Scout day camp. Order of the Arrow activities take place there along with Wood Badge training.

Camp M.K. Brown

Camp M.K. Brown covers a section of land near Wheeler, TX, and contains a 65-acre lake.  It was built in 1968 with the generous donations from Montagu Kingsmill Brown, for which the camp is named.

Geography
Camp M.K. Brown is located 35 miles East of Pampa, Texas and 5 miles Northwest of Wheeler, Texas on Highway 152 in Wheeler County with an elevation of 2,526 feet above sea level.  Sweetwater Creek runs South through the camp with multiple dams creating one large reservoir and four smaller ponds collectively known as Valley Springs Lakes. It has a semi-arid temperate steppe climate, with the average summer high temperature in the 90s and an average winter low temperature in the low 20s. The average yearly rainfall is 22 inches.

The camp is heavily wooded with huge, old cottonwood trees.  There are pear trees, wild plum shrubs, mulberry trees, and blackberry bushes located around the camp closer to the creek.  Plant life away from the water is the usual yucca, mesquite, cactus, and prairie grasses local to the area.  Wildlife includes turtle, rabbit, prairie dogs, coyotes, bobcat, deer, and pit vipers like rattlesnakes and water moccasins.

Programs and Facilities

Camp M.K. Brown has 11 permanent campsites and 3 semi-permanent campsites available year-round, each with cleared areas and a fire ring.  Most have running water (except during winter months) and a latrine nearby.  The main lake is suitable for fishing, canoeing, row boating, and swimming. The swimming area is marked off from the end of the main dock to the shoreline. The ponds are suitable for fishing only. Permanent structures include a dining hall with kitchen, nature and crafts building, administrative building, Trading Post, adult showers, and a ranger's house. The camp has an archery range, rifle range, shotgun range, and a council ring.

The camp is used for weekend camping by nearby units. It also holds annual merit badge summer camps, camporees, and Cub Scout day camp. Order of the Arrow activities take place there along with Wood Badge and other youth training events.

Order of the Arrow
Nischa Achowalogen Lodge #486

Chapters
 Busy Beaver
 Cherokee
 Iron Horse
 Zulu

See also
 Scouting in Texas

References

Local councils of the Boy Scouts of America
Randall County, Texas
Southern Region (Boy Scouts of America)
1987 establishments in Texas